Ibrahim Sekagya (born 19 December 1980) is a Ugandan former footballer who played as a centre back. He is currently the head coach for New York Red Bulls II of MLS Next Pro.

Club career
Born in Kawempe Kampala, as a boy, Sekagya started out his career playing on a bare surfaced pitch at Kawempe commonly known as 'kataka' before joining State House and later local giants Kampala City Council FC (KCC FC) Sekagya started his senior career with Kampala City Council in 1992, before moving to Argentina in 1998 to try to make a career in football. His first Argentine club was Atlético de Rafaela in the Primera B Nacional. In 2002, he moved to Ferro Carril Oeste in the Primera B Metropolitana, subsequently helping the team to win the league and secure promotion to the Primera B Nacional. In 2005, he was signed by Arsenal de Sarandí of the Argentine Primera División, where he spent two seasons.

In June 2007, Sekagya signed a three-year contract with Red Bull Salzburg, the then current champions of the Austrian Bundesliga. He made his Bundesliga debut on 11 July 2007 in Salzburg's 4–1 win against SC Rheindorf Altach and scored his first league goal on 22 July 2007 to secure Salzburg a 2–2 away draw at FK Austria Wien. He quickly established himself as a regular with the club and finished his first season with 34 Bundesliga appearances to his name, scoring three goals in the league. In his six seasons at the club Sekagya appeared in 165 league matches and scored 6 goals. During this time he helped the club capture three Austrian Football Bundesliga titles and one Austrian Cup.

On 11 July 2013, Sekagya joined MLS side New York Red Bulls on a free transfer, following his departure from sister club Red Bull Salzburg. On 4 August 2013 Sekagya made his debut for New York starting as a defensive midfielder in a 3–2 victory over Sporting Kansas City. On 27 October 2013, Sekagya scored the go ahead goal in the last game of the season against the Chicago Fire at Red Bull Arena to help his team to a 5–2 victory and become champions of the regular season. It was the club's first major trophy in their 17-year history. However, Sekagya's giveaway led to an equalizer in Houston's 2–1 victory that knocked New York out of the 2013 MLS Cup Playoffs. During the 2014 season Sekagya became a regular starter for New York helping the club reach the MLS Cup playoffs. Sekagya retired from professional football in early 2015.

International career
Sekagya also played for the Ugandan national football team where he was the team's captain. He made 8 appearances and scored one goal in their qualifying campaign for the 2006 FIFA World Cup, as well as 3 appearances and a goal in the qualifiers for the 2010 FIFA World Cup.

International goals

Coaching
Following his retirement, Sekagya joined the coaching staff of the New York Red Bulls. On 2 July 2022, Sekagya was named interim head coach for the Red Bulls' USL Championship side, New York Red Bulls II.

Honours
 Primera B Metropolitana (1):
 2002–03
 Austrian Football Bundesliga (3):
 2008–09, 2009–10, 2011–12
 Austrian Cup (1):
 2012
 MLS Supporters' Shield (1):
 2013

Club career

References

External links

 
 
 
 Ibrahim Sekagya at Football Lineups
 
 Guardian Football Stats 

1980 births
Living people
Sportspeople from Kampala
Ugandan footballers
Uganda international footballers
Ugandan expatriate footballers
Association football defenders
Kampala Capital City Authority FC players
Atlético de Rafaela footballers
Ferro Carril Oeste footballers
Arsenal de Sarandí footballers
FC Red Bull Salzburg players
New York Red Bulls players
New York Red Bulls non-playing staff
Argentine Primera División players
Primera Nacional players
Primera B Metropolitana players
Austrian Football Bundesliga players
Major League Soccer players
Expatriate footballers in Argentina
Expatriate footballers in Austria
Expatriate soccer players in the United States
Ugandan expatriate sportspeople in Argentina
Ugandan expatriate sportspeople in Austria
Ugandan expatriate sportspeople in the United States
USL Championship coaches
New York Red Bulls II coaches
Ugandan expatriate football managers
Expatriate soccer managers in the United States